Hurstville ZFC (also known as Hurstville Zagreb FC and Hurstville FC) is a soccer club based in the suburban district of St George, New South Wales, Australia. The club currently competes in the  along with the NPL Juniors and on an Association level, in the Football St. George competitions.

Being an Australian soccer club of Croatian heritage, it is affiliated and syndicated with the Croatian Soccer Association of Australia as well as Football Federation Australia.

History

Hurstville Zagreb was established by Croatian migrants on 23 November 1970.
Registered with St George FA in 1971,  the club rapidly advanced through several divisions until they reached the semi-professional NSW State League and became the second largest Croatian-heritage club in Sydney, behind Sydney United 58 FC, in the process.

Tournaments

 Australian-Croatian Soccer Tournament was hosted by Hurstville Zagreb in 1999.
 Martin Knežević Cup – a 6-a-side tournament in honor and memory of club stalwart Martin Knežević (1974–1996) that is held on an annual basis with 36 teams competing in 2017.

Notable players

This club has produced some notable professionals over the decades, most of whom are of Croatian heritage or ethnicity.

Below listed are footballers who have played for Hurstville and the Australia national football team at various levels.

  Ante Covic
  Tomi Juric
  Ante Milicic
  Mark Babic
  Ante Moric
  Richard Pleša
  Joe Vrkić

References

External links
  Soccerway Profile

Soccer clubs in Sydney
Croatian sports clubs in Australia
1970 establishments in Australia
Association football clubs established in 1970